Swan Lake is a  reservoir on an unnamed tributary of the Middle Raccoon River, just south and east of Carroll, Iowa. It is the southern terminus of the Sauk Rail Trail, a path linking the lake to Blackhawk State Park in Sac County.

Sources
Iowa Department of Natural Resources
Statistics

Hypsography (Iowa State University)
Sauk Rail Trail
Iowa State University
Travel Iowa

Bodies of water of Carroll County, Iowa
Reservoirs in Iowa